The 1931 season of the Paraguayan Primera División, the top category of Paraguayan football, was played by 14 teams. The national champions were Olimpia.

Results

Standings

External links
Paraguay 1931 season at RSSSF

Paraguayan Primera División seasons
Para
Primera